Zrahia is a religious moshav in southern Israel. Located near Kiryat Malakhi, it falls under the jurisdiction of Shafir Regional Council.

History
The village was established in 1950, on  land belonging to the depopulated Palestinian village of al-Sawafir al-Sharqiyya. Most of the founders were immigrants from Iran, though there were also some from the Maghreb, particularly Morocco. It was named after Zrahia, an ancestor of Ezra (Ezra 7:4), who came to the Land of Israel after the Babylonian captivity.

References

Moshavim
Religious Israeli communities
Populated places established in 1950
Populated places in Southern District (Israel)
1950 establishments in Israel
Iranian-Jewish culture in Israel
Moroccan-Jewish culture in Israel